Everett Clarence "Dizzy" Nutter (August 27, 1893July 25, 1958) was a former professional baseball player. In an eight-year career, Nutter played in one major league season with the Boston Braves in 1919.

Biography

Early life
Nutter was born "Everett Clarence Nutter" on August 27, 1893, in Roseville, Ohio.

Career
In 1914, Nutter began his professional baseball career playing for the D-level Charleston Senators of the Ohio State League. During the 1914 season, Nutter recorded a .271 batting average with 108 hits and seven home runs. He continued his minor-league career in 1915 with Charleston before joining the B-level New Haven Murlins in 1916. Nutter played in New Haven for two years before his contract was purchased by the Boston Braves on August 29, 1919. He made his major league debut for the Boston Braves on September 7, 1919, in a game against the New York Giants, playing played center field and recording two hits in four plate appearances.

After playing eighteen games for the Braves during which he batted .212, Nutter returned to New Haven for the remainder of the 1919 season. For the New Haven Weissmen, he led the team in hits, doubles, and triples during the 1919 and 1920 seasons. Nutter's last season of professional baseball was in 1922 for New Haven Weissmen.

After baseball
Nutter died on July 25, 1958, in Battle Creek, Michigan, and was buried in Rose Hill Cemetery in Roseville, Ohio.

References

External links

1893 births
1958 deaths
Baseball players from Ohio
Boston Braves players
People from Roseville, Ohio
Zanesville Flood Sufferers players
Charleston Senators players
New Haven Weissmen players
New Haven Murlins players
New Haven Indians players